662 is an album by blues guitarist and singer Christone "Kingfish" Ingram.  His second album, it was released in CD, LP, and digital formats on July 23, 2021.

At the 2022 Grammys, 662 won the Grammy Award for Best Contemporary Blues Album.

Critical reception
On AllMusic, Stephen Thomas Erlewine said, "662 is a quintessential second album from a hot young gun: it's a record that consolidates the personality Christone "Kingfish" Ingram unveiled on his debut while also expanding his musical and lyrical reach....  Ingram's muscular guitar and vocals are known quantities and it's good to hear him add some funk and rock to his blues..."

On The Arts Fuse, Scott McLennan wrote, "On 662, 22-year-old Christone "Kingfish" Ingram's scintillating vision of the blues comes into its own, his already highly developed guitar skills matched by a maturing singing voice that commands the listener's attention.... 662 will appeal to hard-core blues fans along with those who want more of a hyphenated blues sound, be it blues-rock, blues-funk or blues-pop."

On Rock and Blues Muse, Mike O'Cull said, "22-year-old blues phenomenon Christone "Kingfish" Ingram blows past all expectations on his brand new Alligator Records release 662.... Christone "Kingfish" Ingram is, by all indications, a bottomless well of music and 662 is required listening for every blues lover out there. Spin it once and you’ll understand."

Track listing

Personnel
Musicians
Christone "Kingfish" Ingram – guitar, vocals
Tom Hambridge – drums, background vocals, chimes
Kenny Greenberg – guitar
Bob Britt – guitar
Glenn Worf – bass
Tommy MacDonald – bass
Marty Sammon – piano, Hammond B3 organ, Wurlitzer piano
Max Abrams – saxophone
Julio Diaz – trumpet

Production
Produced by Tom Hambridge
Executive producer: Ric Whitney
Engineer: Zach Allen
Assistant engineer: Ryan Yount
Mixing, mastering: Tom Hambridge, Michael Saint-Leon
Additional recording: Michael Saint-Leon
Photos: Justin Hardiman
Design: Kevin Niemiec

References

Christone "Kingfish" Ingram albums
Alligator Records albums
2021 albums